Zellerbach is a surname. Notable people with the surname include:

James David Zellerbach (1892–1963), American businessman and ambassador
Merla Zellerbach (1930–2014), American author and activist

See also
Zellerbach Hall